Hans Michael Frank (23 May 1900 – 16 October 1946) was a German politician and lawyer who served as head of the General Government in Nazi-occupied Poland during the Second World War.

Frank was an early member of the German Workers' Party (DAP), the precursor of the Nazi Party (NSDAP). He took part in the failed Beer Hall Putsch, and later became Adolf Hitler's personal legal adviser as well as the lawyer of the NSDAP. In December 1934, Frank joined the Hitler Cabinet as a Reichsminister without portfolio.

After the German invasion of Poland in 1939, Frank was appointed Governor-General of the occupied Polish territories. During his tenure, he instituted a reign of terror against the civilian population and became directly involved in the mass murder of Jews. He engaged in the use of forced labour and oversaw four of the extermination camps. Frank remained head of the General Government until its collapse in early 1945. During that time, over 4 million people were murdered under his jurisdiction.

After the war, Frank was found guilty of war crimes and crimes against humanity at the Nuremberg trials. He was sentenced to death and executed by hanging in October 1946.

Early years
Frank, the middle child of three, was born in Karlsruhe to Karl, a lawyer, and his wife, Magdalena (née Buchmaier), a daughter of a prosperous baker. He graduated from high school at Maximilians gymnasium in Munich. At seventeen he joined the German Army fighting in World War I, but did not serve time at the front.

After the war, Frank studied law and economics, from 1919 to the summer semester of 1921 at the University of Munich, between 1921 and 1922 at the University of Kiel, and back from the winter semester 1922 to 1923 at Munich. On 21 July 1923, he passed the final exam there, obtaining his Dr. jur. degree in 1924.

Between 1919 and 1920, he was a member of the Thule Völkisch society. He served also in the Freikorps under Franz Ritter von Epp's command, taking part in the crackdown of the Münchner Räterepublik. In 1919, as did other members of the Thule Society, he joined the German Workers' Party (DAP) at its beginning.

Nazi Party career
Although the DAP evolved quite soon into NSDAP (Nazi Party), Frank waited until September 1923 to become a member of the Sturmabteilung (SA), where he would eventually attain the rank of SA-Obergruppenführer in November 1937. In October 1923, he officially joined the NSDAP. In November of the same year, Frank took part in the "Beer Hall Putsch", the failed coup attempt intended to parallel Mussolini's March on Rome. In the aftermath of the attempted putsch, Frank fled to Austria, returning in Munich only in 1924, after the pending legal proceedings were stayed.

Frank rose to become Adolf Hitler's personal legal adviser. As the Nazis rose to power, Frank also served as the party's lawyer. He represented it in over 2,400 cases and spent over $10,000. This sometimes brought him into conflict with other lawyers. Once, a former teacher appealed to him: "I beg you to leave these people alone! No good will come of it! Political movements that begin in the criminal courts will end in the criminal courts!" In September–October 1930, Frank served as the defence lawyer at the court-martial in Leipzig of Lieutenants Richard Scheringer, Hans Friedrich Wendt and Hanns Ludin, three Reichswehr officers charged with membership in the NSDAP. The trial was a media sensation. Hitler himself testified and the defence successfully put the Weimar Republic itself on trial. Many Army officers developed a sympathetic view of the Nazi movement as a consequence.

In October 1928, Frank founded the National Socialist German Jurists Association and became its leader. He was also elected to the Reichstag from electoral constituency 8, Leignitz, in October 1930. In April 1933, he was made Minister of Justice for Bavaria, serving until December 1934 when he was named a Reichsminister without portfolio in the Reich government. On 2 June 1933, he was made a Reichsleiter, the second highest political rank in the Nazi Party, in his capacity as head of the party's legal affairs department. On 26 June 1933, Frank founded the Academy for German Law. At its inaugural meeting on 2 October 1933, he was named its Leader (renamed President on 9 August 1934) and would continue in this capacity until 20 August 1942 when he also left his positions as Reichsleiter and head of the Jurists Association. Frank also served as the Chairman of the Academy's Legal Philosophy Committee and was editor of its several publications. In January 1934, Frank was named as one of the three judges on the Supreme Party Court. 

Frank objected to extrajudicial killings as it weakened the power of the legal system (of which he himself was a prominent member), both at the Dachau concentration camp and during the "Night of the Long Knives". Frank's view of what the judicial process required was that:

On 7 April 1938, Frank addressed some 10,000 Nazis at the Passau Nibelungenhalle.

Governor-General in Poland

In September 1939, Frank was assigned as Chief of Administration to Gerd von Rundstedt in the German military administration in occupied Poland. Beginning 26 October 1939, following the completion of the invasion of Poland, Frank served as Governor-General of the occupied Polish territories, overseeing the General Government, the area of Poland not directly incorporated into Germany (roughly 90,000 km2 out of the 187,000 km2 Germany had gained).

Frank oversaw the segregation of the Jews into ghettos. From the outset, Jews were discriminated against savagely and rations given to them were slender. He oversaw the enormous Warsaw ghetto, and the use of Polish civilians as forced labour. In 1942, he lost his positions of authority outside the General Government after annoying Hitler with a series of speeches in Berlin, Vienna, Heidelberg, and Munich and also as part of a power struggle with Friedrich-Wilhelm Krüger, the State Secretary for Security – head of the SS and the police in the General Government. Krüger himself was ultimately replaced by Wilhelm Koppe.

On 16 December 1941, Frank spelled out to his senior officials the approaching annihilation of the Jews:A great Jewish migration will begin in any case. But what should we do with the Jews? Do you think they will be settled in Ostland, in villages? We were told in Berlin, 'Why all this bother? We can do nothing with them either in Ostland or in the Reichskommissariat. So liquidate them yourselves.' Gentlemen, I must ask you to rid yourself of all feelings of pity. We must annihilate the Jews wherever we find them and whenever it is possible.

When this was read to him at the Nuremberg trials he said:One has to take the diary as a whole. You can not go through 43 volumes and pick out single sentences and separate them from their context. I would like to say here that I do not want to argue or quibble about individual phrases. It was a wild and stormy period filled with terrible passions, and when a whole country is on fire and a life and death struggle is going on, such words may easily be used... Some of the words are terrible. I myself must admit that I was shocked at many of the words which I had used... A thousand years will pass and still this guilt of Germany will not have been erased.

An assassination attempt by the Polish Secret State on 29/30 January 1944 (the night preceding the 11th anniversary of Hitler's appointment as Chancellor of Germany) in Szarów near Kraków failed. A special train with Frank travelling to Lviv was derailed after an explosive device discharged but no one was killed. Around 100 Polish hostages from Montelupich prison were executed as a punishment for the act.

Death camps
Hans Frank participated in the growth of the politics leading to genocide in Poland. Under his guidance mass murder became a deliberate policy. The General Government was the location of four out of six extermination camps, namely: Bełżec, Treblinka, Majdanek and Sobibór; Chełmno and Birkenau fell just outside the borders of the General Government. Frank later claimed that the extermination of Jews was entirely controlled by Heinrich Himmler and the SS, and he - Frank - was unaware of the extermination camps in the General Government until early 1944, a claim found to be untrue by the Nuremberg tribunal. During his testimony at Nuremberg, Frank claimed he submitted resignation requests to Hitler on 14 occasions, but Hitler would not allow him to resign. Frank fled the General Government in January 1945, as the Soviet Army advanced.

Capture and trial

Frank was captured by American troops on 4 May 1945, at Tegernsee in southern Bavaria. He attempted suicide twice. He was indicted for war crimes and tried before the International Military Tribunal in Nuremberg from 20 November 1945 to 1 October 1946. During the trial he converted, guided by Fr Sixtus O'Connor , to Roman Catholicism, and claimed to have had a series of religious experiences.

Frank voluntarily surrendered 43 volumes of his personal diaries to the Allies, which were then used against him as evidence of his guilt. Frank confessed to some of the charges, and testified in response to questions from his defence attorney:
after having heard the testimony of the witness Rudolf Höss, my conscience does not allow me to throw the responsibility solely on these minor people. I myself have never installed an extermination camp for Jews, or promoted the existence of such camps; but if Adolf Hitler personally has laid that dreadful responsibility on his people, then it is mine too, for we have fought against Jewry for years; and we have indulged in the most horrible utterances.

During their trials, he and Albert Speer were the only defendants to show any degree of remorse for their crimes. At the same time, he accused the Allies, especially the Soviets, of their own wartime atrocities. The former German Governor-General of Poland was found guilty of war crimes and crimes against humanity on 1 October 1946, and he was sentenced to death by hanging. The death sentence was carried out at Nuremberg Prison on 16 October by US Army Master Sergeant John C. Woods. Journalist Joseph Kingsbury-Smith wrote of the execution:

He answered to his name quietly and when asked for any last statement, he replied "I am thankful for the kind treatment during my captivity and I ask God to accept me with mercy."

His body and those of the other nine executed prisoners and the corpse of Hermann Göring were cremated at Ostfriedhof (Munich) and the ashes were scattered in the river Isar.

Memoirs

While awaiting execution, he wrote his memoirs, Im Angesicht des Galgens (In the face of the gallows). In the capacity as his attorney, Frank was privy to personal details of Hitler's life. In his memoirs, Frank made the sensational claim that Hitler had commissioned him to investigate Hitler's family in 1930 after a "blackmail letter" had been received from Hitler's nephew, William Patrick Hitler, who allegedly threatened to reveal embarrassing facts about his uncle's ancestry. Frank said that the investigation uncovered evidence that Maria Schicklgruber, Hitler's paternal grandmother, had been working as a cook in the household of a Jewish man named Leopold Frankenberger before she gave birth to Hitler's father, Alois, out of wedlock. Frank claimed that he had obtained from a relative of Hitler's by marriage a collection of letters between Maria Schicklgruber and a member of the Frankenberger family that discussed a stipend for her after she left the family's employ. According to Frank, Hitler told him that the letters did not prove that the Frankenberger son was his father but rather his grandmother had merely extorted money from Frankenberger by threatening to claim his paternity of her illegitimate child.

Frank accepted this explanation, but added that it was still just possible that Hitler had some Jewish ancestry. But he thought it unlikely because, "from his entire demeanor, the fact that Adolf Hitler had no Jewish blood coursing through his veins seems so clearly evident that nothing more need be said on this."

Given that all Jews had been expelled from the province of Styria (which includes Graz) in the 15th century and were not allowed to return until the 1860s, scholars such as Ian Kershaw and Brigitte Hamann dismiss as baseless the "Frankenberger hypothesis", which before had only Frank's speculation to support it. There is no evidence outside of Frank's statements for the existence of a "Leopold Frankenberger" living in Graz in the 1830s, and Frank's story is inaccurate on several points such as the claim that Maria Schicklgruber came from "Leonding near Linz", when in fact she came from the hamlet of Strones near the village of Döllersheim. Some suggest that Frank (who turned against Nazism after 1945 but remained an anti-Semitic fanatic) made the claim that Hitler had Jewish ancestry as a way of proving that Hitler was really a "Jew" and not an "Aryan", and in this way "proved" that the Third Reich's crimes were the work of the "Jewish" Hitler. The full anti-Semitic implications of Frank's story were borne out in a letter entitled "Was Hitler a Jew?", written to the editor of a Saudi newspaper in 1982 by a German man living in Saudi Arabia. The writer accepted Frank's story as the truth, and added since Hitler was a Jew, "the Jews should pay Germans reparations for the War, because one of theirs caused the destruction of Germany".

But Jewish-American author Ron Rosenbaum suggested another reason for Frank's story:On the other hand, a different version of Frank emerges in the brilliantly vicious, utterly unforgiving portrait of him by his son, Niklas Frank, who (in a memoir called In the Shadow of the Reich) depicts his father as a craven coward and weakling, but one not without a kind of animal cunning, an instinct for lying, insinuation, self-aggrandizement. For this Hans Frank, disgraced and facing death on the gallows for following Hitler, fabricating such a story might be a cunning way of ensuring his place in history as the one man who gave the world the hidden key to the mystery of Hitler's psyche. While at the same time, revenging himself on his former master for having led him to this end by foisting a sordid and humiliating explanation of Hitler on him for all posterity. In any case, it was one Frank knew the victors would find seductive.

Family
On 2 April 1925 Frank married 29-year-old secretary Brigitte Herbst (1895–1959) from Forst (Lausitz). The wedding took place in Munich and the couple honeymooned in Venetia. Hans and Brigitte Frank had five children:
 Sigrid Frank (b. 1927, Munich – d. in South Africa)
 Norman Frank (b. 1928, Munich – d. 2010)
 Brigitte Frank (b. 1935, Munich – d. 1981)
 Michael Frank (b. 1937, Munich – d. 1990)
 Niklas Frank (b. 1939, Munich)

Brigitte Herbst had a reputation for having a more dominant personality than her husband: after 1939 she called herself "a queen of Poland" ("Königin von Polen"). The marriage was unhappy and became colder from year to year. When Frank sought a divorce in 1942, Brigitte gave everything to save their marriage in order to remain the "First Lady in the General Government". One of her most famous comments was "I'd rather be widowed than divorced from a Reichsminister!" Frank answered: "So you are my deadly enemy!"

In 1987, Niklas Frank wrote a book about his father, Der Vater: Eine Abrechnung ("The Father: A Settling of Accounts"), which was published in English in 1991 as In the Shadow of the Reich. The book, which was serialized in the magazine Stern, caused controversy in Germany because of the scathing way in which the younger Frank depicted his father: Niklas referred to him as "a slime-hole of a Hitler fanatic" and questioned his remorse before his execution.

Niklas is the sole living child of Hans and Brigitte Frank. Sigrid remained a committed Nazi who emigrated to South Africa during the apartheid regime and died there. Brigitte committed suicide in 1981; Michael and Norman died in 1990 and 2010, respectively.

Decorations and awards
 Nuremberg Party Day Badge, 1929
 Golden Party Badge, 1933
 Blood Order #532, 1934
 Grand Cross of the Order of Saints Maurice and Lazarus, 1936
 Danzig Cross 1st Class, 1940
 War Merit Cross 2nd Class and 1st Class without Swords, 1940
 NSDAP Long Service Award in Gold, Silver and Bronze

See also
 Command responsibility
 German war crimes
 Glossary of Nazi Germany
 List of Nazi Party leaders and officials
 Nazi crimes against the Polish nation
 Nuremberg trials
 Nuremberg Trials bibliography
 The Holocaust in Poland
 Holocaust (miniseries) – TV production in which Frank is portrayed

References

Citations

Bibliography

Further reading
 
 Schenk, Dieter (2006). Hans Frank: Hitlers Kronjurist und General-Gouverneur. Frankfurt am Main, S. Fischer Verlag.  (in German).

External links
 
 Testimony of Frank at Nuremberg
 Hans Frank (Character) on IMDb
 

1900 births
1946 deaths
Converts to Roman Catholicism
Executed people from Baden-Württemberg
General Government
German Army personnel of World War I
German Old Catholics
German people convicted of crimes against humanity
German Roman Catholics
German Workers Party members
Heads of government who were later imprisoned
Holocaust perpetrators
Holocaust perpetrators in Poland
Lawyers in the Nazi Party
Members of the Academy for German Law
Members of the Reichstag of Nazi Germany
Members of the Reichstag of the Weimar Republic
Nazi Germany ministers
Nazi Party officials
Nazi Party politicians
Nazis who participated in the Beer Hall Putsch
People executed by the International Military Tribunal in Nuremberg
People executed for crimes against humanity
People from the Grand Duchy of Baden
Politicians from Karlsruhe
Reichsleiters
Sturmabteilung officers
Thule Society members
20th-century Freikorps personnel
20th-century German lawyers